The Loyalty Building, formerly known as the Buyers Building and the Guardian Building, is a building located in downtown Portland, Oregon listed on the National Register of Historic Places.

See also
 National Register of Historic Places listings in Southwest Portland, Oregon

References

Further reading

External links
 

1928 establishments in Oregon
Chicago school architecture in Oregon
Commercial buildings completed in 1928
National Register of Historic Places in Portland, Oregon
Southwest Portland, Oregon
Portland Historic Landmarks